"HP" is a song by Colombian singer Maluma, released as a single from his fourth studio album, 11:11. The song was released as the album's lead single on 28 February 2019. The song marked Maluma's 13th number one on the Billboard Latin Airplay chart.

Chart performance 
For the week dated 8 June 2019, "HP" became Maluma's 13th number one on the Billboard Latin Airplay chart. This marked Maluma's second number one in 2019, following his Karol G collaboration, "Créeme", which ruled the chart for one week. "HP" also marked Maluma's 12th number one on the Latin Rhythm chart. It also topped the national charts in Ecuador, Paraguay and Venezuela, and reached the top 10 in multiple other territories.

Music video 
The music video was released alongside the song on 28 February 2019. It was directed by Nuno Gomes and filmed in Miami, Florida. In the video, Maluma throws a block party with friends to celebrate the protagonist being a single woman. The video has over 580 million views as of October 2019.

Live performances 
Maluma performed "HP" on The Tonight Show Starring Jimmy Fallon on 14 May 2019.

Charts

Weekly charts

Year-end charts

Certifications

See also
 List of Billboard Argentina Hot 100 top-ten singles in 2019
List of Billboard number-one Latin songs of 2019

References

2019 songs
2019 singles
Maluma songs
Songs written by Edgar Barrera
Songs written by Maluma (singer)
Sony Music Latin singles
Spanish-language songs
Latin trap songs
Song recordings produced by Edgar Barrera